The Lawyer's Secret is a 1931 American pre-Code crime film directed by Louis J. Gasnier and Max Marcin and written by Lloyd Corrigan, James Hilary Finn, and Max Marcin. The film stars Clive Brook, Charles "Buddy" Rogers, Richard Arlen, Fay Wray, Jean Arthur, Francis McDonald, and Harold Goodwin. The film was released on June 6, 1931, by Paramount Pictures.

Cast
Clive Brook as Drake Norris
Charles "Buddy" Rogers as Laurie Roberts 
Richard Arlen as Joe Hart
Fay Wray as Kay Roberts
Jean Arthur as Beatrice Stevens
Francis McDonald as The Weasel
Harold Goodwin as 'Madame X'
Syd Saylor as Red
Lawrence LaMarr as Tom
Sheila Bromley as Madge - Madame X's Girlfriend (uncredited)
G. Pat Collins as Motorcycle Officer (uncredited)
Gordon De Main as Detective (uncredited)
Claire Dodd as Party Guest (uncredited)
Robert Homans as Chief of Police (uncredited)
Payne B. Johnson as Baby (uncredited)
Edward LeSaint as Prison Warden (uncredited)
Wilbur Mack as Frank - District Attorney (uncredited)
Guy Oliver as Police Turnkey (uncredited)
Bob Perry as Baldy (uncredited)
Hal Price as Detective (uncredited)
Willard Robertson as Police Desk Sergeant (uncredited)

References

External links

Stills at pre-code.com

1931 films
American crime films
1931 crime films
Paramount Pictures films
Films directed by Louis J. Gasnier
American black-and-white films
1930s English-language films
1930s American films